John D. Self, Jr. (Pete) - (April 19, 1923 – October 30, 2020) was an American attorney and politician who served as a member of the  Alabama House of Representatives from 1959 to 1963. He served on the House judiciary and insurance committees.

References

1923 births
2020 deaths
Members of the Alabama House of Representatives